George Edward "Jed" Smock, Jr. (January 4, 1943 – June 6, 2022), better known as Brother Jed, was an American evangelist whose open-air preaching ministry was concentrated on college campuses. He preached at major universities in all 50 US states and other countries. As an itinerant preacher, he usually spent only a few days on each campus, visiting the northern campuses in the fall and spring and the southern campuses in the winter. In 2004, he relocated to Columbia, Missouri, where he often preached at the University of Missouri and other colleges throughout the Midwest. In the summer of 2013, he relocated his ministry and residence to his hometown of Terre Haute, Indiana.

Biography 
Brother Jed's self-described lifestyle of "drunkenness, dissipation, and debauchery" began while he was a freshman in high school. Older friends exposed him to alcohol, which became a regular part of his life. Smock began attending Indiana State University in 1960, studying social studies and English. By his second year, he had established himself as the heaviest drinker in the fraternity. Smock states in his autobiography that, despite his lifestyle, he graduated near the top of his class.

Smock attended graduate school at Indiana State University, where he earned a master's degree in history and wrote a thesis on "the personal effects of smoking seven straight joints of marijuana" while he was a research assistant in psychology for the Institute of Research into Human Behavior at the school. Smock served as a history professor for one year at the University of Wisconsin–La Crosse.

He converted to Christianity after being preached to by an Arab carrying a cross in Morocco.

Smock formed Campus Ministry USA, a para-church organization, in 1984. In 2004, the group moved its operations from Newark, Ohio to Columbia, Missouri, where he often preached at the University of Missouri on Speakers Circle.

Brother Jed left Columbia for Indiana in 2013. His family was documented for a pilot TV series while preaching in Indiana.

Brother Jed frequented Eastern Illinois University.

Personal life 
Jed married Cynthia D. Lasseter Smock (who calls herself “Sister Cindy” when preaching). They have five daughters, all of whom have accompanied them on their travels and appearances on college campuses.

Preaching style and personal views 

Smock wrote a spiritual autobiography, Who Will Rise Up? in which he described his dissolute youth and conversion experience, and presented his justification for his confrontational style of evangelism.

Smock and his wife Cindy used a distinctive preaching style, termed "confrontational evangelism" in the subtitle of his autobiography. This controversial variant of evangelism is shared by some street and campus preachers, who hope that a spiritual rebuke will force sinners to repent. In his autobiography, Smock referred to his college evangelical group as "The Destroyers", but this name is not presently being used on his website.

Smock was a member of the United Methodist Church, although his actions, views, and theology were not indicative of its positions.

College newspapers have reported some of his statements: "I don't know how the whorehouses in this town stay open — all of you sorority girls are giving it away for free!" and "Who are you, Bob Marley?" (addressed to a black student with dreadlocks). He often shouted, "A masturbator today is a homosexual tomorrow." His assistants carried signs declaring that feminists, liberals, and those who listen to rock and roll are destined for Hell, along with homosexuals, fornicators, those who use tampons, and masturbators. As a result of his aggressive, rude and confrontational style of preaching, Brother Jed was frequently mocked and accused of intolerance.

Besides issues relating to coarse language with immodest sexual references, Smock claimed to be sinless, holding a position called sinless perfection. He held to Pelagianism, identifying himself with the teachings of Pelagius. In addition, he held a view of God which denies that goodness is an essential attribute of God's nature.

Fictional portrayals 
Smock's character was the basis of the 2012 short, Battle of the Sects, in which an extreme evangelical preacher visits a university only to be run out by the campus Christians.

See also 
 List of campus preachers

Notes

External links 
 
 The Brother Jed Phenomenon – Brother Jed incorporated this op-ed from Cal Poly's Mustang Daily into his autobiographical book Who Will Rise Up?
  Brother Jed moves beyond Speakers Circle, Columbia Missourian
Obituary

Further reading 
 Handelman, David "College is Hell: The Destroyers have preached hellfire and damnation on campus for a decade. But can they get a witness?" Rolling Stone 27 March 1986, pp. 87+

1943 births
2022 deaths
American evangelicals
Converts to Methodism
Campus preachers
Indiana State University alumni
American United Methodists
People from Brookings, South Dakota
Writers from South Dakota
University of Wisconsin–La Crosse faculty